Matthew Brittain (born 5 May 1987) is a South African rower. He won a gold medal in the Men's lightweight coxless four event at the 2012 Summer Olympics, with teammates James Thompson, John Smith and Sizwe Ndlovu.

References

External links
 

1987 births
Living people
South African male rowers
Olympic rowers of South Africa
Olympic gold medalists for South Africa
Olympic medalists in rowing
Rowers at the 2012 Summer Olympics
Rowers from Johannesburg
Medalists at the 2012 Summer Olympics
White South African people
21st-century South African people